Agah may refer to:

Geography
Agah-e Olya, a village in Kermanshah Province, Iran
Agah-e Sofla, a village in Kermanshah Province, Iran

See also
 Agah (name)